Mercedes Franco (born 3 November 1948, Maturín) is a Venezuelan author and novelist. She has written several opinion press articles and two novels: La Capa Roja (1992) and Crónica Caribana (2006).

References 

Living people
People from Maturín
Venezuelan women writers
Venezuelan novelists
1948 births